Thomas Sharpe may refer to:

 Thomas Sharpe (politician) (1866–1929), Canadian politician, mayor of Winnipeg, 1904–1906
 Thomas Sharpe (RAF officer) (1887–?), British World War I flying ace
 Thomas G. Sharpe, Michigan politician
 Tom Sharpe (1928–2013), author
 Tom Sharpe (musician), American musician and composer

See also
Thomas Sharp (disambiguation)